Enos D. Hopping (1805 – September 1, 1847) was a brigadier general in the United States Army during the Mexican–American War.

Biography
He was born in 1805 to Jehiel Hopping and Harriet Mead.

A personal and political friend of Secretary of War William L. Marcy, Hopping was appointed a brigadier general in the Regular Army by President James K. Polk on March 3, 1847.

He was commanding a camp of instruction in northern Mexico when he died on September 1, 1847.

References
 
 

1805 births
1847 deaths
American military personnel of the Mexican–American War
Military personnel from New York City
United States Army generals